Pseudochazara amalthea is a butterfly species belonging to the family Nymphalidae. It can be found in Greece, the Balkans, Crete and Bulgaria in the Struma Valley south of the Kresna Gorge.

The wingspan is 45–65 mm. The butterflies fly from June to August.

Taxonomy
The species is often treated as a subspecies of Pseudochazara anthelea.

References

External links
 Satyrinae of the Western Palearctic - Pseudochazara amalthea

Satyrini
Butterflies described in 1845